The Committee of the Verkhovna Rada of Ukraine on issues of budget or simply, the Budget Committee is a standing committee of the Verkhovna Rada, Ukraine's unicameral parliament. The committee is one of the largest in the parliament's 8th convocation, consisting of 27 people's deputies. Its entire composition was approved on December 4, 2014.

It was created on June 28, 1990 during the twelfth convocation of the Verkhovna Rada of the Ukrainian Soviet Socialist Republic (first convocation of the Verkhovna Rada of Ukraine) as the "Permanent Commission of the Verkhovna Rada of the Ukrainian SSR on issues of planning, budget, finances and prices". The committee's first chairman was Andriy Pecherov.

Presidium
On December 4, 2014, the Budget Committee's composition was approved by the Verkhovna Rada. Its presidium consists of six deputies:

Scope
The Budget Committee's scope is to draft, prepare, and consider laws within the authority of the Verkhovna Rada, and to perform control functions in the following areas of its jurisdiction:

 state fiscal policy and intergovernmental relations;
 state budget of Ukraine (including issues of income, expenditures, and monitoring the implementation of the budget);
 budgeting;
 internal and external public debt;

 examination on the impact of bills, drafts of other acts on budget performance and compliance with laws governing fiscal relations;
 activities of public financial institutions;
 activities of the  Accounting Chamber

Subcommittees
The Budget Committee consists of the following subcommittees:

 Subcommittee on the evaluation of draft laws regarding the impact on the budget figures and compliance with budget legislation
 Subcommittee on the state budget revenues
 Subcommittee on the state debt and state budget financing
 Subcommittee on the state budget expenditures
 Subcommittee on the state budget social programs

 Subcommittee on the state budget investment programs
 Subcommittee on the local budgets
 Subcommittee on the state financial control and activity of the Accounting Chamber
 Subcommittee on the improving provisions of the Budget Code of Ukraine
 Subcommittee on the budget support of regional development
 Subcommittee on the budget policy

References

External links
 

Budget
Government agencies established in 1990
1990 establishments in Ukraine
Government finances in Ukraine